A wrench or spanner is a type of hand tool.

Wrench may also refer to:

Arts and entertainment
 Wrench (comics), a fictional character in the Marvel Universe
 The Wrench, a 1978 novel by Primo Levi
 Mr. Wrench, a fictional character in the American TV series Fargo
 "Wrench", a song by The Almighty from Crank
 "Wrench", a song by Apparatus from their self-titled album
 "Wrench", a song by Funeral for a Friend from Your History Is Mine: 2002–2009

Other uses
 Wrench (surname) (including a list of people with the name)
 Wrench (screw theory), in applied mathematics and physics

See also
 Wrench fault, in geology
 Winch, a mechanical device used mostly for (un)winding of ropes